Bhayna Union is a union parishad situated at Harinakunda Upazila,  in Jhenaidah District, Khulna Division of Bangladesh. There are 11 villages and 6 mouzas in the union.

References

External links
 

Unions of Khulna Division
Unions of Harinakunda Upazila
Unions of Jhenaidah District